Anna Maria Schwegelin or Schwägelin (1729–1781) was an alleged German (Bavarian) witch, long considered the last person to be convicted for witchcraft in Germany.

Life

Anna Maria Schwegelin was born in poverty in the area near Kempten im Allgäu and served as a maid. In 1751, a Protestant was employed as a coachman, and converted to the Catholic faith. Schwegelin tried to prevent this. It is also said that she abandoned her Catholic faith in order to marry a Protestant, but that the marriage plans were broken off.  

In 1769, she injured her leg, and in 1770, she was put in the poor house. Suspicions of her (and the coachman's) involvement in Satanism led to an arrest; she reportedly freely confessed having made a pact with the Devil. She was judged guilty and sentenced to be executed on 11 April 1775.  By July 1775, however, the case seems to have been forgotten, and Schwegelin remained in jail, where she died of natural causes in 1781. 

It was long believed that this sentence was carried out, and that she was the last person executed for sorcery in Germany.  She was the last person to be sentenced to death for sorcery in Germany, but as her execution was never carried out, this is inaccurate. Similarly, she has been described as the last person to be executed for witchcraft in Europe, but this distinction belongs to Barbara Zdunk.

See also 
 Anna Schnidenwind

References 

 Wolfgang Petz: Die letzte Hexe. Das Schicksal der Anna Maria Schwägelin. Campus Verlag, Frankfurt am Main, New York 2007, 
 Artikel "Anna Maria Schwägelin" im Lexikon zur Geschichte der Hexenverfolgung  
 This article is partially a translation of the equivalent on German wikipedia
Anna Maria Schwagel Elizabeth A. Sackler Center for Feminist Art: The Dinner Party: Heritage Floor. Accessed March 2012 

1729 births
1781 deaths
18th-century German people
18th-century German women
German people who died in prison custody
People convicted of witchcraft
People from the Duchy of Bavaria
Women from Bavaria
Witch trials in Germany
Prisoners who died in German detention